Lucie André (born 17 January 1988) is a French professional golfer who has played on the Ladies European Tour (LET). She was the No. 1 ranked amateur in Europe 2009 after winning the Spanish Ladies Amateur and the Vagliano Trophy. She won the 2017 Czech Ladies Challenge.

Early life and amateur career
André started to play golf aged 11, introduced by her parents, at Mionnay Golf Club in Bourg-en-Bresse. She had a successful amateur career and was the leading ladies amateur golfer on the 2009 EGA Women's Amateur Rankings.

She was runner-up behind Carlota Ciganda at the 2008 French Ladies Amateur. In 2009, she won the Spanish Ladies Amateur and was runner-up at the Portuguese Ladies Amateur. In 2010, she won the German Ladies Amateur.

André won the Vagliano Trophy with the European team in 2009. She played in the Espirito Santo Trophy in 2008 and 2010. In 2010, she finished tied for third together with Alexandra Bonetti and Manon Gidali.

She was the leading amateur on the 2010 LET Access Series, and was low amateur after a tie for 16th at the 2010 Open de France Feminin.

Professional career
André turned professional in January 2011 after finishing T5 at the LET Final Qualifying School, and joined the Ladies European Tour.

She finished T4 at the 2011 Lacoste Ladies Open de France, two strokes behind Felicity Johnson. In 2015, she was T4 at the Deloitte Ladies Open, T7 at the Turkish Airlines Ladies Open and T8 at the Omega Dubai Ladies Masters. She qualified for the 2015 Women's British Open as one of the top 25 on the LET Order of Merit not otherwise exempt, but did not make the cut.

In March 2016, a T16 at the Lalla Meryem Cup propelled her into the top 300 in the Women's World Golf Rankings.

In 2017, she was relegated to the LET Access Series, where she played the next five seasons. She won the 2017 Czech Ladies Challenge following a playoff.

Amateur wins
2009 Spanish International Ladies Amateur Championship
2010 German International Ladies Amateur Championship

Professional wins (2)

LET Access Series wins (2)

Team appearances
Amateur
Espirito Santo Trophy (representing France): 2008, 2010
Vagliano Trophy (representing the Continent of Europe): 2009 (winners)
European Ladies' Team Championship (representing France): 2009, 2010

References

External links

French female golfers
Ladies European Tour golfers
Sportspeople from Bourg-en-Bresse
1988 births
Living people
21st-century French women